An outlaw motorcycle club is a motorcycle subculture. It is generally centered on the use of cruiser motorcycles, particularly Harley-Davidsons and choppers, and a set of ideals that purport to celebrate freedom, nonconformity to mainstream culture, and loyalty to the biker group.

This article contains a list of conflicts involving outlaw motorcycle clubs.

Australia

Asia

Balkans

Belgium

Canada

Germany

Ireland

Italy

Netherlands

New Zealand

Scandinavia

Russia

South Africa

United Kingdom

United States

See also
 Lennoxville massacre
 Milperra massacre
 National Western Complex shootout
 River Run riot
 Shedden massacre
 Waco shootout

References